Robert Craig "Bob" Salmond (22 September 1911 – October 1998) was a Scottish professional footballer who played as an defender.

Club career
Salmond played for Portsmouth between 1931 and 1938, amassing 135 appearances. He joined Chelsea in 1938, and would go on to play 24 games in a career interrupted by the Second World War.

References

1911 births
1998 deaths
Scottish footballers
Association football defenders
Dundee North End F.C. players
Portsmouth F.C. players
Chelsea F.C. players
Banbury United F.C. players